The Simonini Victor 1 Super is an Italian aircraft engine, designed and produced by Simonini Racing of San Dalmazio di Serramazzoni for use in ultralight aircraft.

Design and development
The Victor 1 Super is a single cylinder two-stroke, liquid-cooled, gasoline engine design, with a poly V belt reduction drive with reduction ratios of 2.70:1, 2.80:1 and 3.00:1. It employs dual capacitor discharge ignition electronic ignition and produces  at 6200 rpm.

Specifications (Victor 1 Super)

See also

References

External links

Simonini aircraft engines
Two-stroke aircraft piston engines